Fuchsia jimenezii  is a plant of the genus Fuchsia native to Central America. It belongs to the section Jimenezia and is most closely related to the lineage (section Schufia) that gave rise to Fuchsia arborescens and Fuchsia paniculata.

References

jimenezii
Flora of Central America